Igbanke is an Ika people community in Edo State, Nigeria. Ika is Igbo dialects which is spoken in parts of Delta and Edo States of Nigeria. Igbanke was founded by migrants from Onitsha and Ika land. The autonomous communities in Igbanke include; Omolua, Ottah, Idumuodin, Ake, Oligia and Igbontor.

There are Enogie in all communities in Igbanke. Enogie is a Benin title for a Duke. Igbanke was influenced by Benin and is located in Orhionmwon Local Government Area of modern-day Edo state of Nigeria. The people of Igbanke  speak Ika dialect .

History
Igbanke originated from six villages which came together from the earliest times preceding the slave trade era. The people of Idumodin, Ake/Obiogba, Omolua, Oligie, Ottah and Igbontor are the villages that came together to establish their settlement which over the years has been referred to as Igbanke.

Language
Although, majority of the Igbanke people speak "Ika" dialect, some of them are bilinguals, that is, some of them speak more than one language fluently, that is, the Igbo language.

Culture and Tradition
The Egu festival is one of the cultural and traditional activities that is celebrated at Igbanke. The Egu Festival is also referred to as Ohiuhiu. It is a religious feast done in honour of the head deity of Igbanke. This god is known as the god of harvest and sustainer of the people. This festival precedes the new yam harvest, so it is fondly called the New yam festival. It is often held between the month of August and September and the duration of the festival is one month full of various activities that are held every market day which is the Eken, that is every four days.

Before the announcement of Egu by the six Enigie in their various villages, they must meet and perform the Okika Nmo which is the sacrifice to the gods of the land, performed by the kings. Part of the festival is making the community clean by clearing the bushes and roads in the villages by the youths and the painting of walls and palaces by women, which is usually done with native chalk called "nzu" and red earth. They do all these, believing that some of their ancestors would visit them. Also, family heads appease their gods which is also part of the cleansing, water yam pudding known as ‘Embeghe’  is prepared to drive evil away from the land. Those who worship "Nwa Obu" from other villages and other towns also come to Igbanke for the Egu festival in order to join their brethren in Igbake to appease "Nwa Obu" on behalf of the land. After the Embeghe, on the Eken which is the market day, the Nni Ogwa Ukin, that is, the ‘night food’ is prepared using the old yams and with some local spices to appease the gods and ancestors in the night, this is eaten around 11pm. Uroko dance is performed round the villages by the men dancing and visiting every compound entertaining and also collecting variety of gifts from people. This happens just for few days before the next Eken day.

On "Ohiuhiu" day, the "Nwa Obu" priest  in the night goes to  the forest hill where the NwaObu shrine is located at Ogbogbo. He is accompanied by the worshippers, including priests,  priestesses  and the Otu Ikpedi; their drummers and various dance groups. The people are entertained by the musicians and dancers while waiting for Nwa Obu priest to return from the shrine because the priest is the only one meant to perform the rituals, the people only give their supports.  The priest distribute Nzu to the people which was dug out from the shrine after the sacrifice. People come from various communities for cleansing and healing. Also, part of the activities is the wrestling contests between various clans and dancing competition which is done at the village square. The warrior who is the strongest during the competition will be given a title.

Towards the last week of the festival, the people share gifts among themselves. Gifts are shared between relatives and friends and all married women are permitted to go to their maiden family to prepare food for them and spend some time with them.

On the last Eken day of the festival, the Egu is brought to a close by the Nwa Obu priests, who goes around to pray for people from house-to-house. The prayer marks the end and the completion of the Egu Festival before the people start eating the new yam.

Occupation
Igbanke is located within the rain forest belt of the vegetation zone of West Africa. Traditionally, the Igbanke people are majorly farmers. Their agricultural products are yams, cassava, vegetables and plantain. Other occupations include hunting, trading, and medicine. The women are mostly traders. The Igbanke Eken Market, located at Oligie, served as a major market that connected the northern and southern regions during the colonial era. some Igbanke people are also craftsmen/women and some specialize in blacksmithing, pottery, and basket making among others. There are also traditional midwives and healers, and diviners in Igbanke. However, in modern times, the Igbanke are represented in most fields of human endeavors across the world

Governance
Igbanke people practice an autonomous kind of leadership. Each of the villages is govern by its traditional ruler, addressed as the ‘Enogie/Eze’.

References

Ika people
Populated places in Edo State